Tegeticula is a genus of moths of the family Prodoxidae, one of three genera known as yucca moths; they are mutualistic pollinators of various Yucca and Hesperoyucca species.

Species
 Tegeticula altiplanella
 Tegeticula antithetica
 Tegeticula baccatella
 Tegeticula baja
 Tegeticula californica
 Tegeticula carnerosanella
 Tegeticula cassandra
 Tegeticula corruptrix
 Tegeticula elatella
 Tegeticula intermedia
 Tegeticula maculata
 Tegeticula maderae
 Tegeticula mexicana (syn: Tegeticula treculeanella)
 Tegeticula mojavella
 Tegeticula rostratella
 Tegeticula superficiella
 Tegeticula synthetica  (syn: Tegeticula paradoxa)
 Tegeticula tambasi
 Tegeticula tehuacana
 Tegeticula yuccasella

References
 Althoff, D.M., Segraves, K.A., Leebens-Mack, J., & Pellmyr, O. (2006). "Patterns of Speciation in the Yucca Moths: Parallel Species Radiations within the Tegeticula yuccasella Species Complex." Systematic Biology 55(3): 398-410. 

Prodoxidae
Adeloidea genera